Yelena Ivanova (born 6 October 1973) is a Kazakhstani former diver. She competed in the women's 3 metre springboard event at the 1996 Summer Olympics.

References

External links
 

1973 births
Living people
Kazakhstani female divers
Olympic divers of Kazakhstan
Divers at the 1996 Summer Olympics
Place of birth missing (living people)
20th-century Kazakhstani women
21st-century Kazakhstani women